Ali Pur Chattha is a Tehsil and union council of Ali Pur Chattha Tehsil, Wazirabad District, Punjab, Pakistan. Ali Pur Chattha (formerly Akalgarh) is a tehsil of Wazirabad District in the Gujrat Division of Pakistan.  It is situated nearly 35 km away in the west from the district capital Wazirabad District, about 25 to 30 km in North of Hafizabad and 8 km in the south from Rasool Nagar and 15 km Chenab River (Qadirabad Barrage) and almost 26 km of the east of Vanike Tarar.

History
In the Ali Pur Chattha area, there are the ruins of the historical city of Akālgarh with the remnants of the Sikh Empire in this area.

The municipality was created in 1867 during colonial rule. At that time, the town lay on the Wazirabad-Lyallpur branch of the North-Western Railway.

Communication
Alipur is connected with Wazirabad via Wazirabad-Alipur Highway and connected with Gujranwala via Kalaskay through Gujranwala-Alipur Highway. The Wazirabad-Faisalabad rail link has a railway station in the city called Alipur Chatta railway station.

References

Cities and towns in Gujranwala District
Populated places in Wazirabad Tehsil
Populated places established in 1867